Belleayre Mountain, in Catskill Park, New York, United States, is a ski resort owned and operated by the Olympic Regional Development Authority or ORDA.  It is the only Catskill resort that contains a gondola and attracts many new visitors from New York City. Skier and snowboarder visits have grown from 70,000 in 1995 to more than 175,000 in 2007.

History
During the 1800s, Catskill and Adirondack deforestation had created massive siltation of New York City harbor and imperiled shipping up the Hudson River. In 1855 New York became one of the first states to create constitutionally-designated "Forever Wild" preserves to prevent environmental and economic harms, to create a desperately needed water supply for New York City. In 1947, the people of New York passed a constitutional amendment by referendum to allow an intensive use ski center within this protected forever wild region.

Belleayre Mountain, located off State Route 28, 2-1/2 hours from New York City, was declared "Forever Wild" by the New York State Forest Preserve in 1885. Early on, skiers would side-step or hike their way more than 3,000 feet to the top of the wooded trails.  Skiing enthusiasts in the 1940s pressured politicians to develop Belleayre for families and extreme skiers alike.

In 1947, bills were introduced allowing the State of New York to create Belleayre Mountain.

Construction began in 1949, and Belleayre began its premier winter season with five trails, an electrically powered rope tow, New York’s first chairlift (A Roebling Single, later converted to a double), a summit lodge, a temporary base lodge with a cafeteria and dirt floors, and parking for 300.  Belleayre was immediately popular among local residents and became a center for winter sports in the region and an economic catalyst for surrounding communities.

As business increased, Belleayre expanded its skiing terrain, adding 12 new trails, 3 lifts, and a new base lodge in the 1950s. Major expansions and technology and equipment upgrades continued in the following decades.

The 1970s included the addition of snowmaking technology.

In 1977, the Roebling Double Chairlift was replaced by a Double Chairlift from Hall. The Hall Double was called the Summit Double Chairlift.

In 1982, two double chairlifts sharing towers by Doppelmayr were installed to service the lower green terrain, called Lift 1 and Lift 2.

In 1986, a Riblet Triple Chairlift with a mid-station was installed to service the top of the mountain from the Overlook and Sunset Lodges. This lift was used for summer sky rides until 2017.

In 1991, the current Deer Run trail and Cayuga were cut on the west side.

In 1999, Garaventa installed two fixed-grip quad chairlifts with mid stations were installed that served the upper half of the mountain these two chairlifts were called Superchief and Tomahawk. The Superchief Quad was installed to replace the Hall Summit Double Chairlift. The Hall Summit Double was relocated to Plattekill Mountain as the North Face Double Chairlift. The Tomahawk Quad was installed on the west side of Belleayre to serve the Belleayre summit. It served new terrain from the summit and terrain formerly accessible by a Roebling T-Bar.

In 2001, the Tomahawk parking lot along with the Dot Nebel opened on the west side of Belleayre. Which was able to provide the new area with easier access and increase skier visits to that area.

In 2006, the Superchief Fixed Grip Quad was upgraded to a Detachable High-Speed Quad by Doppelmayr/CTEC, and many parts were installed as the Ridge Quad at Catamount Ski Area.

In November 2012, the resort was transferred from the NYS DEC to the Olympic Regional Development Authority (ORDA). ORDA also operates Gore Mountain and Whiteface Mountain ski resorts.

During the 2017-2018 ski season, an eight-passenger gondola, named Catskill Thunder, began operation. It is the only gondola lift in The Catskills. And only one of 3 gondolas in NY state, all of them being on ORDA mountains. This lift is the longest in the Catskills and revolutionized the future of Belleayre forever.

In the 2018-19 season, a new state-of-the-art medical building was constructed on the side of parking lot E on the old location of the Tee Pee Flats learning area. The building replaced an old and small facility at the top of the Lightning Quad. The new facility is also more accessible to the discovery lodge, where most people visit today due to the gondola.

During the 2019-2020 season, a new fixed-grip quad lift named Lightning replaced Lift 1 and Lift 2. This lift had a loading carpet, hockey puck footrests that are safer for children, and comfortable padding for the seats. Even though no problems were reported with the old lifts, the new lift was most likely installed to make it easier for beginners and to create a new bunny slope by shortening the liftline.

Trails
Belleayre contains an extensive trails system for Alpine skiing and Cross-country skiing. With many different trail ratings and elements that suit the needs of many skiers and snowboarders.

A few trails are rated differently between the trail map, snow report, website, and trail signs, these are marked with an *.

Alpline
 Belleayre has 50 downhill alpine ski trails ranging from the easiest trails on the lower half of the mountain to more difficult trails that are mostly halfway up the upper half of the mountain, as well as on the sides. Most difficult and expert trails are mostly all on the upper half of the mountain past the halfway point.

Glade Trails
There are 6 glades at Belleayre, they run on natural snow and are only most difficult and expert rated. Belleayre has the most marked glades in the Catskills, usually, at least 2 are open every season.

Freestyle Terrain
There is 1 terrain park, 1 progression park, and 1 X-course on the mountain.

Cross country trails
 Belleayre's cross-country ski trails are separated from the downhill slopes and has its own parking area. There is no fee for these trails and they run 100% on natural snow. Tracks are not regularly set and the trails are not maintained, groomed, or patrolled. Hiking, snowshoeing, and cross-country skiing are permitted on the trails. There are 5 cross-country trails at Belleayre Mountain totaling 9.2 kilometers.

Lifts
The chairlifts are mostly made by the Doppelmayr/Garaventa Group with Lift 7 as an exception that is made by Riblet. All the lifts are numbered from 1 to 8, and the carpet lifts are numbered from 3 to 5. All the upper chairlifts have been originally painted according to the trails it served. Being painted blue and sometimes black mostly between the mid stations. This is to help people be aware of what trails they are riding to and preventing people not being able to get down. This is now mostly abandoned with the Belleayre Express and Catskill Thunder not having a mid-station. The Tomahawk Quad was  repainted in the summer of 2017 to a full blue, using Belleayre's shade of Belleayre blue. Leaving Lift 7 as the only lift with the original painting pattern.

Note: the numbers are not all official, but follow the past and remaining numbering system.

Base Areas and Lodges
There are 3 base areas and 3 lodges at Belleayre.

References

External links
Official Website

Ski areas and resorts in New York (state)
Catskill Park
Tourist attractions in Ulster County, New York
Shandaken, New York
Buildings and structures in Ulster County, New York